Huddersfield Town's 1946–47 campaign was the first full season since the end of World War II, but Town would have little to cheer during the season. Under David Steele, Town were in relegation trouble for most of the season, but because of the even worse displays of Brentford and Leeds United saw Town live to fight another day in Division 1.

Squad at the start of the season

Review
David Steele had been Town manager since 1943, but this was his first season in league football management with the Leeds Road club and it would be his last in Huddersfield. Town lost 5 of their opening league matches, but oddly enough won the other game 5–2 against Derby County. During October, Town lost 4 matches and conceded 19 goals in a 5–0 defeat against Leeds United, a 6–1 loss at Wolverhampton Wanderers and 4–1 defeats to Liverpool and Middlesbrough.

Following that run, Town beat Charlton Athletic 5–1, but Town's form never made any dramatic improvements and even lost an FA Cup tie at home to Barnsley. Luckily during that season, Town were up against 2 worse teams in the relegation dogfight in Brentford and Leeds United, who were more than 7 points behind Town by the end of the season. This however didn't stop Steele from resigning at the end of the season.

Squad at the end of the season

Results

Division One

FA Cup

Appearances and goals

1946-47
English football clubs 1946–47 season